I Will is the fourth single from Dutch pop singer Do's second album Follow Me. Previously recorded by Bianca Ryan, the song was released in February 2007. Do has re-recorded it in Sweden to give the song more power. The song has previously been performed on the Dutch television channel RTL 4.

Track listing
 "I Will" – 4.14
 "I Will (Instrumental)" – 4.14
 "Living on a Fantasy (Live)" – 3.50

Chart positions

References

Do (singer) songs
2006 songs
Sony BMG singles
Songs written by Bridget Benenate
Songs written by Matthew Gerrard
Songs written by Robbie Nevil